is a city located in Ibaraki Prefecture, Japan. , the city had an estimated population of 51,035 in 20,030 households and a population density of 645 persons per km². The percentage of the population aged over 65 was 26.3%.

Geography
Tsukubamirai is located in southern Ibaraki Prefecture, in the low-lying marshy flatlands south of Lake Kasumigaura. It is about 40 kilometers from central Tokyo. The elevation of the city is about 5 to 25 meters above sea level. The Kinugawa River and Kokaigawa rivers flow through the city. The eastern and western parts are hilly.

Surrounding municipalities
Ibaraki Prefecture
Moriya
Tsukuba
 Ryūgasaki
 Toride
 Jōsō

Climate
Tsukubamirai has a Humid continental climate (Köppen Cfa) characterized by warm summers and cool winters with light snowfall.  The average annual temperature in Tsukubamirai is 14.1 °C. The average annual rainfall is 1299 mm with September as the wettest month. The temperatures are highest on average in August, at around 24.2 °C, and lowest in January, at around 2.9 °C.

Demographics
Per Japanese census data, the population of Tsukubamirai has increased over the past 50 years.

History
The area of Tsubakimarai was a rural region of Tsukuba District of Hitachi Province noted as a major rice-growing region, with the exception of a small portion in the south, which belonged to Kitasōma District of Shimōsa Province. The villages of Nagasaki and Kokinu, which were located north of the Tone River in Kitasōma District were transferred to the newly created Ibaraki Prefecture in 1875 and the region was organized into 11 villages with the establishment of the modern municipalities system on April 1, 1889.

The city of Tsukubamirai was established on March 27, 2006, from the merger of the town of Ina, and the village of Yawara (both from Tsukuba District).

Government
Tsukubamirai has a mayor-council form of government with a directly elected mayor and a unicameral city council of 18 members. Tsukubamirai contributes one members to the Ibaraki Prefectural Assembly. In terms of national politics, the city is part of Ibaraki 6th district of the lower house of the Diet of Japan.

Economy
Tsukubamirai was a purely agricultural area until large scale housing development began after the 1960s, and by the 1980s, with the opening of the Joban Expressway and several industrial parks, the area increasingly became a commuter town for the Tokyo Metropolis. This tend intensified after 2005 with the opening of the Tsukuba Express

Education
Tsukubamirai has ten public elementary schools and four public middle schools operated by the city government, and one public high school operated by the Ibaraki Prefectural Board of Education.

Transportation

Railway
  Metropolitan Intercity Railway Company - Tsukuba Express
  
Kantō Railway - Jōsō Line

Highway
  – Yawara Interchange

Local attractions
Fukuoka Dam
 Itabashi Fudouson temple
 Warp Station Edo
 Tatsunami Sumo Stable
 Mamiya Rinzo Museum

References

External links

Official Website 

Cities in Ibaraki Prefecture
Tsukubamirai, Ibaraki